You Tell Me is a debut collaborative studio album by Field Music's Peter Brewis and Admiral Fallow's Sarah Hayes, appearing under the name You Tell Me. It was released on January 11, 2019 through Memphis Industries.

Track listing

References

2019 debut albums
Memphis Industries albums